Nicolaas Hubertus Holzken (born December 16, 1983) is a Dutch super middleweight kickboxer and professional boxer currently signed to ONE Championship, where he competes in the Lightweight division. He is the former Glory Welterweight Champion. In 2015 Kickboxing Planet voted him the Kickboxer of the Year. As of November 2021, Combat Press ranks him as the #5 welterweight kickboxer in the world.

In 2018, Holzken participated in the World Boxing Super Series as a substitute.

Background
After his parents separated when he was an infant, Nieky was raised up by his paternal grandparents. Inspired by martial arts movies, he started training kickboxing at the age of ten.

Career

K-1
Nieky Holzken made his K-1 debut on November 26, 2006, at K-1 World MAX North European Qualification in Stockholm, Sweden. He won the tournament by three consecutive KO's over Björn Kjöllerström, Joakim Karlsson and Elias Daniel. The win qualified him for the K-1 World MAX 2007 Final Elimination, where he was matched up against the reigning K-1 MAX champion Buakaw Por. Pramuk. He lost the fight by unanimous decision.

Glory
He faced Murat Direkçi at Glory 2: Brussels on October 6, 2012, in Brussels, Belgium and won via TKO due to a cut in the second round.

He defeated Karim Ghajji via TKO due to a cut in an extension round at Glory 6: Istanbul in Istanbul, Turkey on April 6, 2013.

He was to fight at SLAMM!! - Soema na Basi IV: Londt vs. Adegbuyi in Paramaribo, Suriname on August 8, 2013 but withdrew for undisclosed reasons.

He was initially scheduled to fight Marc de Bonte in the Glory 13: Tokyo - Welterweight World Championship Tournament semi-finals in Tokyo, Japan on December 21, 2013 but his opponent was then changed to Karapet Karapetyan who he had previously fought and beat in February 2012 by decision. He knocked Karapetyan down in rounds one and two en route to a clear unanimous decision win before facing Joseph Valtellini in the final. In a back-and-forth fight where both pressed forward, landing powerful but technical punches and kicks, Holzken scored a TKO in the dying seconds of the third and final round to be crowned the inaugural Glory World Welterweight (-77.1 kg/170 lb) Tournament Champion.

He was set to fight for the inaugural Glory Welterweight Championship against Marc de Bonte at Glory 14: Zagreb in Zagreb, Croatia on March 8, 2014 but the fight was cancelled when he suffered a shoulder injury in a car accident. The match was rescheduled for Glory 16: Denver in Broomfield, Colorado, US on May 3, 2014 but his lingering shoulder injury again forced him out, and he was replaced by Karapet Karapetyan.

On February 6, 2015, Holzken was part of a one-night, four-man welterweight tournament at Glory 19 to determine who would get the next title shot.  In the semifinals, he faced Alexander Stetsurenko and won via unanimous decision.  In the finals, he faced Raymond Daniels and won via TKO in the third round.

On April 16, 2016, he defeated Yoann Kongolo. After the match-up Holzken expressed his desire to in-ring commentator Joseph Valtellini that he wished to face him again.

On July 2, 2018, Holzken announced on his social media that he had rejected a contract offer from Glory and was entertaining offers from other promotions.

Boxing
Since 2013, Holzken had competed in professional boxing alongside his kickboxing career, but in February 2018 he got the biggest opportunity in the sport when he stepped in at late notice to face Callum Smith in the World Boxing Super Series super-middleweight tournament. The Dutchman was 13-0 coming in, and Smith 23-0. Smith took the win by unanimous decision, and then went on to KO George Groves in the final.

ONE Championship
Holzken returned to kickboxing when he signed for ONE Championship, making his debut with a second round KO over Cosmo Alexandre at ONE Championship: Warrior's Dream in November 2018.

He would challenge Regian Eersel for the inaugural ONE Lightweight Kickboxing World Championship at ONE Championship: Enter the Dragon in May 2019 and lose via unanimous decision. The two would rematch for the title in October 2019 at ONE Championship: Dawn of Valor, but Holzken lost again via unanimous decision.

It was announced that Nieky Holzken would face Elliot Compton at ONE Championship: Big Bang 2 on December 11, 2020. It was also revealed that Holzken had signed a six-fight contract extension with ONE after his original contract expired. Holzken knocked Compton out in the first round, with a liver shot.

Holzken faced John Wayne Parr in a Muay Thai bout at ONE on TNT 3 on April 21, 2021. He won the bout via TKO after dropping Parr with a head kick in the second round. A mere fortnight after the bout Holzken announced that his contract had expired and he became a free agent.

On September 13, 2021, Holzken announced that he had signed a new multi-fight contract with ONE Championship.

As the first fight of his new six-fight contract, Holzken was scheduled to face the one-time ONE Lightweight Kickboxing title challenger Islam Murtazaev at ONE: X on March 26, 2022. With the removal of all Russian athletes from the event as a result of the 2022 Russian invasion of Ukraine, Murtazaev was replaced by Sinsamut Klinmee and the fight was changed to Muay Thai rules. He lost the fight by a second-round knockout.

Holzken was expected to face the one-time ONE welterweight title challenger Islam Murtazaev at ONE 162 on October 21, 2022. He withdrew with an injury on four days before the bout was supposed to take place.

Personal life
Holzken's family and in-laws are Woonwagenbewoners, Indigenous Dutch Travellers (Gypsies).

Holzken and his wife Nathellie have a son Geraldo and a daughter Willisha.

Titles
Kickboxingplanet.com
2015 - Kickboxingplanet Kickboxer of the Year 2015
Bloody Elbow.com
2013 Fight of the Year vs. Joseph Valtellini on December 21
Glory
2013 Glory Welterweight (-77 kg/169.8 lb) World Championship Tournament Champion
2015 Glory Welterweight (-77 kg/169.8 lb) Contender Tournament Winner
Glory Welterweight (-77 kg/169.8 lb) Championship (one time; three defenses; Former)
WFCA
2011 WFCA K-1 Rules Super Middleweight World champion
SIMTA
2007 SIMTA 72 kg European champion
K-1
2007 K-1 MAX North European Qualification champion
Liver Kick.com
2013 Fight of the Year vs. Joseph Valtellini on December 21
SIMTA
2005 SIMTA Light Middleweight European champion.

Kickboxing record
{{Kickboxing record start|title=Kickboxing record|record=94 Wins (58 (T)KO's), 17 Losses, 0 Draws, 1 No Contest}}

|- style="background:#fbb;"
| 2022-03-26|| Loss ||align=left| Sinsamut Klinmee || ONE: X || Kallang, Singapore || KO (Punch) || 2 || 1:39 || 94-17-0

|- style="background:#cfc;"
|  2021-04-21 || Win || align="left" | John Wayne Parr || ONE on TNT 3 || Kallang, Singapore || TKO (head kick) || 2 || 1:23 || 94-16-0
|-
|- style="background:#cfc;"
|  2020-12-11 || Win || align="left" | Elliot Compton || ONE Championship: Big Bang 2 || Kallang, Singapore || KO (liver punch) || 1 || 1:36 || 93-16-0
|-
|-  style="background:#fbb;"
| 2019-10-26||Loss ||align=left| Regian Eersel ||  |ONE Championship: Dawn Of Valor || Jakarta, Indonesia || Decision (Unanimous) || 5 || 3:00 || 92-16-0
|-
! style=background:white colspan=9 |
|-
|-  style="background:#fbb;"
|  2019-05-17 || Loss || align="left" | Regian Eersel ||  |ONE Championship 96: Enter the Dragon || Kallang, Singapore || Decision (Unanimous) || 5 || 3:00 ||  92-15-0
|-
! style=background:white colspan=9 |
|-
|-
|- style="background:#cfc;"
|  2019-02-22 || Win || align="left" | Mustapha Haida || ONE Championship 90: Call to Greatness || Kallang, Singapore || Decision (Unanimous) || 3 || 3:00 || 92-14-0 
|-
|- style="background:#cfc;"
|  2018-11-17 || Win || align="left" | Cosmo Alexandre || ONE Championship 84: Warrior's Dream || Jakarta, Indonesia || KO (uppercut) || 2 || 2:59 || 91-14-0 
|-
|-  style="background:#fbb;"
| 2017-12-09 || Loss ||align=left| Alim Nabiev  || Glory 49: Rotterdam || Rotterdam, Netherlands || Decision (Unanimous) || 3  || 3:00 || 90-14-0
|-
|-  style="background:#fbb;"
| 2017-06-10 || Loss ||align=left| Cédric Doumbé  || Glory 42: Paris || Paris, France || Decision (split)  || 5  || 3:00 || 90-13-0
|-
! style=background:white colspan=9 |
|-
|-  style="background:#fbb;"
| 2016-12-10 || Loss  ||align=left| Cédric Doumbé || Glory: Collision || Oberhausen, Germany || Decision (split)  || 5 || 3:00  || 90-12-0
|-
! style=background:white colspan=9 |
|-
|-  style="background:#cfc;"
| 2016-10-21 || Win ||align=left| Murthel Groenhart || Glory 34: Denver || Broomfield, Colorado || Decision (unanimous) || 5 || 3:00 || 90-11-0
|-
! style=background:white colspan=9 |
|-  style="background:#cfc;"
| 2016-04-16 || Win ||align=left| Yoann Kongolo || Glory 29: Copenhagen || Copenhagen, Denmark || Decision (unanimous) || 5 || 3:00 || 88-11-0
|-
! style=background:white colspan=9 |
|-  style="background:#cfc;"
| 2015-12-04 || Win ||align=left| Murthel Groenhart || Glory 26: Amsterdam || Amsterdam, Netherlands || Decision (split) || 5 || 3:00 || 87-11-0
|-
! style=background:white colspan=9 |
|-  style="background:#cfc;"
| 2015-08-07 || Win ||align=left| Raymond Daniels || Glory 23: Las Vegas || Las Vegas, Nevada, USA || TKO (right knee cut) || 3 || 1:36 || 86-11-0
|-
! style=background:white colspan=9 |
|-  style="background:#cfc;"
| 2015-02-06 || Win ||align=left| Raymond Daniels || Glory 19: Virginia || Hampton, Virginia, USA || TKO (4 Knockdowns) || 3 || 1:25 || 85-11-0
|-
! style=background:white colspan=9 |
|-  style="background:#cfc;"
| 2015-02-06 || Win ||align=left| Alexander Stetsurenko || Glory 19: Virginia || Hampton, Virginia, USA || Decision (unanimous) || 3 || 3:00 || 84-11-0
|-
! style=background:white colspan=9 |
|-  style="background:#cfc;"
| 2014-12-25 || Win ||align=left| Yusuf Karakaya || One Shot World Series || Antalya, Turkey || TKO (Referee Stoppage) || 1 || 2:05 || 83-11-0
|-  style="background:#cfc;"
| 2013-12-21 || Win ||align=left| Joseph Valtellini || Glory 13: Tokyo || Tokyo, Japan || TKO (right hook) || 3 || 3:00 || 82-11-0
|-
! style=background:white colspan=9 |
|-  style="background:#cfc;"
| 2013-12-21 || Win ||align=left| Karapet Karapetyan || Glory 13: Tokyo || Tokyo, Japan || Decision (unanimous) || 3 || 3:00 || 81-11-0
|-
! style=background:white colspan=9 |
|-  style="background:#cfc;"
| 2013-04-06 || Win ||align=left| Karim Ghajji || Glory 6: Istanbul || Istanbul, Turkey || TKO (cut) || 4 ||  || 80-11-0
|-  style="background:#cfc;"
| 2012-10-06 || Win ||align=left| Murat Direkçi || Glory 2: Brussels || Brussels, Belgium || TKO (cut) || 2 ||  || 79-11-0
|-  style="background:#fbb;"
| 2012-09-02 || Loss ||align=left| L'houcine Ouzgni || Muay Thai Mania V || The Hague, Netherlands || Extra R. Decision|| 4 || 3:00 || 78-11-0
|-  style="background:#cfc;"
| 2012-05-26 || Win ||align=left| Alex Tobiasson Harris || Glory 1: Stockholm || Stockholm, Sweden || TKO (3 knockdowns/liver shots)|| 2 || 2:42 || 78-10-0
|-  style="background:#cfc;"
| 2012-03-23 || Win ||align=left| Davit Kiria || United Glory 15: World Series 2012 || Moscow, Russia || Decision || 3 || 3:00 || 77-10-0
|-  style="background:#cfc;"
| 2012-02-12 || Win ||align=left| Karapet Karapetyan || Natural Powers || Eindhoven, Netherlands || Decision || 5 || 3:00 || 76-10-0
|-
! style=background:white colspan=9 |
|-  style="background:#cfc;"
| 2011-12-23 || Win ||align=left| Cyrus Washington || Klaar Om Te Bossen 3 || Paramaribo, Suriname || TKO (Cut) || 2 ||  ||
|-  style="background:#cfc;"
| 2011-11-06 || Win ||align=left| Ky Hollenbeck || Muay Thai Premier League: Round 3 || The Hague, Netherlands || Decision (Unanimous) || 3 || 3:00 ||
|-  style="background:#cfc;"
| 2011-09-02 || Win ||align=left| Marco Piqué || Muaythai Premier League: Round 1 || Long Beach, California, USA || Decision || 3 || 3:00 ||
|-  style="background:#fbb;"
| 2011-05-28 || Loss ||align=left| Artur Kyshenko || United Glory 14: 2010-2011 World Series Finals || Moscow, Russia || Decision (Unanimous) || 3 || 3:00 ||
|-  style="background:#cfc;"
| 2011-03-19 || Win ||align=left| Carlos Tavares || United Glory 13: 2010-2011 World Series Semifinals || Charleroi, Belgium || KO (Punches) || 1 || 2:04 ||
|-  style="background:#cfc;"
| 2011-02-27 || Win ||align=left| Thilo Schneider || Kickboxgala Golden Glory Helmond, Sporthal Haagdijk || Eindhoven, Netherlands || TKO (Corner stoppage) || 2 || 3:00 ||
|-
! style=background:white colspan=9 |
|-  style="background:#cfc;"
| 2010-10-16 || Win ||align=left| Murthel Groenhart || United Glory 12: 2010-2011 World Series Quarterfinals || Amsterdam, Netherlands || Ext. R Decision || 4 || 3:00 ||
|-  style="background:#fbb;"
| 2010-09-12 || Loss ||align=left| L'houcine Ouzgni || Fightingstars presents: It's Showtime 2010 || Amsterdam, Netherlands || KO (Left flying knee) || 1 || 0:53 ||
|-  style="background:#cfc;"
| 2010-06-19 ||Win  ||align=left| Cagri Ermis || A1 World Combat Cup || Eindhoven, Netherlands || Decision || 3 || 3:00 ||
|-  style="background:#cfc;"
| 2010-05-29 ||Win  ||align=left| Cosmo Alexandre || It's Showtime 2010 Amsterdam || Amsterdam, Netherlands || Decision (4-1) || 3 ||3:00 ||
|-  style="background:#cfc;"
| 2010-04-10 || Win ||align=left| Mourad Salhi || Star Muaythai V || Maastricht, Netherlands || Ext R. Decision || 4 || 3:00 ||
|-  style="background:#cfc;"
| 2010-01-30 || Win ||align=left| Leroy Kaestner || Beast of the East || Zutphen, Netherlands || Decision (Unanimous) || 3 || 3:00 ||
|-  style="background:#cfc;"
| 2009-12-06 || Win ||align=left| Mohammed Medhar || GGH Gala || Helmond, Netherlands || Decision (Unanimous) || 3 || 3:00 ||
|-  style="background:#cfc;"
| 2009-10-17 || Win ||align=left| Faldir Chahbari || Ultimate Glory 11: A Decade of Fights || Amsterdam, Netherlands ||Extr R. Decision (Unanimous) || 4 || 3:00 ||
|-  style="background:#fbb;"
| 2009-07-13 || Loss ||align=left| Buakaw Por.Pramuk || K-1 World MAX 2009 Final 8 || Tokyo, Japan || Decision (Unanimous) || 3 || 3:00 ||
|-  style="background:#cfc;"
| 2009-04-21 || Win ||align=left| Chahid Oulad El Hadj || K-1 World MAX 2009 Final 16 || Fukuoka, Japan || Decision (Majority) || 3 || 3:00 ||
|-  style="background:#cfc;"
| 2008-11-30 || Win ||align=left| Marco Pique || SLAMM "Nederland vs Thailand V" || Almere, Netherlands || KO (Left hook) || 3 || 2:56 ||
|-  style="background:#cfc;"
| 2008-10-01 || Win ||align=left| Virgil Kalakoda || K-1 World MAX 2008 Final || Tokyo, Japan || KO (Right hook) || 1 || 1:42 ||
|-  style="background:#cfc;"
| 2008-07-06 || Win ||align=left| William Diender || Ultimate Glory 9 || Nijmegen, Netherlands || KO (Left body shot) || 4 || 0:47 ||
|-  style="background:#cfc;"
| 2008-05-31 || Win ||align=left| José Reis || Beast of the East 2008 || Zutphen, Netherlands || Decision (Unanimous) || 5 || 3:00 ||
|-  style="background:#cfc;"
| 2008-04-26 || Win ||align=left| Joerie Mes || K-1 World GP 2008 in Amsterdam || Amsterdam, Netherlands || KO (Spinning back kick) || 2 || 2:21 ||
|-  style="background:#cfc;"
| 2008-03-15 || Win ||align=left| Karim El Jouharti || It's Showtime 75MAX Trophy 2008, Super Fight || 's-Hertogenbosch, Netherlands || Decision (Unanimous) || 3 || 3:00 ||
|-  style="background:#fbb;"
| 2008-01-26 || Loss ||align=left| Alviar Lima || Beast of the East || Zutphen, Netherlands || KO (Left hook) || 3 || 0:36 ||
|-
! style=background:white colspan=9 |
|-  style="background:#fbb;"
| 2007-11-24 || Loss ||align=left| Andy Souwer || Shootboxing in the Autotron || Rosmalen, Netherlands || Decision (Unanimous) || 3 || 3:00 ||
|-  style="background:#cfc;"
| 2007-10-27 || Win ||align=left| Lamsongkram Chuwattana || SLAMM "One Night in Bangkok" || Antwerp, Belgium || Decision (Unanimous) || 3 || 3:00 ||
|-  style="background:#cfc;"
| 2007-09-09 || Win ||align=left| Baker Barakat || Ultimate Glory 5 || Amersfoort, Netherlands || Decision (Unanimous) || 3 || 3:00 ||
|-  style="background:#fbb;"
| 2007-06-28 || Loss ||align=left| Buakaw Por. Pramuk || K-1 World MAX 2007 Final Elimination || Tokyo, Japan || Decision (Unanimous) || 3 || 3:00 ||
|-  style="background:#cfc;"
| 2007-05-13 || Win ||align=left| Marijn Geuens || Fight Night in Veghel || Veghel, Netherlands || KO (Spinning back kick) || ||  ||
|-  style="background:#cfc;"
| 2007-04-07 || Win ||align=left| Ruslan Kaladko || Balans Fight Night || Tilburg, Netherlands || Decision (Unanimous) || 3 || 3:00 ||
|-  style="background:#cfc;"
| 2007-01-21 || Win ||align=left| Steve Neumann || Ultimate Glory 2 || Amersfoort, Netherlands || KO (Left uppercut) || 1 || ||
|-  style="background:#cfc;"
| 2006-11-24 || Win ||align=left| Elias Daniel || K-1 World MAX North European Qualification 2007 || Stockholm, Sweden || KO (Left body shot) || 3 || 0:50 ||
|-
! style=background:white colspan=9 |
|-  style="background:#cfc;"
| 2006-11-24 || Win ||align=left| Joakim Karlsson || K-1 World MAX North European Qualification 2007 || Stockholm, Sweden || KO (Straight right punch) || 1 || 0:34 ||
|-  style="background:#cfc;"
| 2006-11-24 || Win ||align=left| Björn Kjöllerström || K-1 World MAX North European Qualification 2007 || Stockholm, Sweden || KO (Right hook) || 1 || 2:20 ||
|-  style="background:#cfc;"
| 2006-09-23 || Win ||align=left| Jan van Denderen || It's Showtime 75MAX Trophy Final 2006, Reserve Fight || Rotterdam, Netherlands || Decision (Unanimous) || 3 || 3:00 ||
|-  style="background:#cfc;"
| 2006-03-26 || Win ||align=left| Terence Oosterling || West Point Fight II || Tilburg, Netherlands || KO (Left cross) || 1 || 0:10 ||
|-  style="background:#cfc;"
| 2006-03-05 || Win ||align=left| Travers Schlee || Future Battle || Bergen op Zoom, Netherlands || TKO || || ||
|-  style="background:#cfc;"
| 2005-12-17 || Win ||align=left| Ferhat Atasoy || WFCA Gala "The Eye of the Tiger" || Arnhem, Netherlands || KO  || || ||
|-  style="background:#fbb;"
| 2005-10-30 || Loss ||align=left| Donald Berner || It's Showtime 75MAX Trophy Alkmaar, Pool B Semi Finals || Alkmaar, Netherlands || Ext R. Decision (Unanimous) || 4 || 3:00 ||
|-  style="background:#cfc;"
| 2005-09-25 || Win ||align=left| Daniel Hudson  || || Manchester, England || KO (Straight right punch) || 1 || 1:01 ||
|-
! style=background:white colspan=9 |
|-  style="background:#cfc;"
| 2005-06-18 || Win ||align=left| Melvin van Leeuwaarde || Showdome IV || Amsterdam, Netherlands || KO || || ||
|-  style="background:#cfc;"
| 2005-04-30 || Win ||align=left| Ömer Tekin || Queens Fight Night || Eindhoven, Netherlands || TKO (Corner stoppage) || 1 || ||
|-  style="background:#cfc;"
| 2005-02-27 || Win ||align=left| Richard Jones || Master Sken's Fight Night || Manchester, England || KO (Straight right punch) || 2 || 1:06 ||
|-  style="background:#cfc;"
| 2004-12-12 || Win ||align=left| Servet Cakir || Face to Face 2nd Edition, Final || Apeldoorn, Netherlands || Decision (Unanimous) || 5 || 2:00 ||
|-
! style=background:white colspan=9 |
|-  style="background:#cfc;"
| 2004-12-12 || Win ||align=left| Felat Atasoy || Face to Face 2nd Edition, Semi Final || Apeldoorn, Netherlands || Decision (Unanimous) || 4 || 2:00 ||
|-  style="background:#cfc;"
| 2004-12-12 || Win ||align=left| Radju Ramdjilal || Face to Face 2nd Edition, Quarter Final || Apeldoorn, Netherlands || KO || ||  ||
|-  style="background:#fbb;"
| 2004-09-04 || Loss ||align=left| Henrik Nygaard || Valhalla 2004 Battle of the Vikings || Aarhus, Denmark || KO || 4 ||  ||
|-  style="background:#cfc;"
| 2004-03-27 || Win ||align=left| Steven Berkolayko || WPKL Muay Thai Champions League XIII || Rotterdam, Netherlands || Decision (Unanimous) || 5 || 2:00 ||
|-  style="background:#c5d2ea;"
| 2004-02-21 || NC ||align=left| Mesut Acikyol || Test of Talent Reloaded III || Mortsel, Belgium || No contest || 5 || ||
|-  style="background:#cfc;"
| 2004-02-20 || Win ||align=left| Richard Jones || Master Sken's Fight Night || Manchester, England || TKO || 4 ||  ||
|-  style="background:#cfc;"
| 2004-02-01 || Win ||align=left| Nico Lombaerts || Thai-Kickboxing Gala || Valkenswaard, Netherlands || KO (Low kicks) || 1 || ||
|-  style="background:#cfc;"
| 2003-12-19 || Win ||align=left| Ali Moftagari || Gala in Kampen || Kampen, Netherlands || KO || ||  ||
|-  style="background:#fbb;"
| 2003-06-29 || Loss ||align=left| Frank Sonders || Dutch Muay Thai Championships || Rotterdam, Netherlands || Decision (Unanimous) || 5 || 2:00 ||
|-  style="background:#fbb;"
| 2002-11-17 || Loss ||align=left| Wesley Robijn || Jellema promotion, Sporthal "De Wetering" || Houten, Netherlands || KO ||  ||  ||
|-  style="background:#cfc;"
| 2002-10-06 || Win ||align=left| Dennis Rooy || WFCA Gala in Nijmegen || Nijmegen, Netherlands || Decision (Unanimous) || 2 || 2:00  ||
|-  style="background:#cfc;"
| 2002-04-13 || Win ||align=left| Reza Rahimpour || TB Den Haag promotion, Fairtex Thaiboksgala || The Hague, Netherlands || TKO || 2 ||  ||
|-
| colspan=9 | Legend''':

Professional boxing record

See also
List of male kickboxers
List of K-1 champions

References

External links
ONE Championship profile
Glory profile

1983 births
Living people
Dutch male kickboxers
Welterweight kickboxers
Middleweight kickboxers
Dutch Muay Thai practitioners
Dutch male boxers
Sportspeople from Helmond
Glory kickboxers
ONE Championship kickboxers
Dutch Traveller sportspeople